This is a timeline of major events concerning Brexit, starting from the referendum, running through Brexit day on 31 January 2020 (when the United Kingdom ceased to be a member state of the European Union), and on to 1 January 2021 (the end of the transition period).

2016
 23 June: The UK holds a referendum on whether to leave the European Union. 52% of voters vote to leave.
 24 June: David Cameron announces his intention to resign as prime minister.
 25 June: The UK representative Jonathan Hill announces his intention to resign as an EU Commissioner.
 13 July: David Cameron resigns and Theresa May accepts the Queen's invitation to form a new government. David Davis is appointed to the newly created post of Secretary of State for Exiting the European Union to oversee withdrawal negotiations.
 27 July: The European Commission nominates French politician Michel Barnier as European Chief Negotiator for the United Kingdom Exiting the European Union.
 3 November: In the Miller case, the High Court ruled against the Secretary of State for Exiting the European Union on the question of whether notice could be given under Article 50 of the Treaty on European Union using the Royal prerogative.
 7 December: The House of Commons votes 461 to 89 in favour of Theresa May's plan to trigger Article 50 by the end of March 2017.

2017
 24 January: The Supreme Court rules in the Miller case that Parliament must pass legislation to authorise the triggering of Article 50.
 26 January: The UK Government introduces a 137-word bill in Parliament to empower Theresa May to initiate Brexit by triggering Article 50. Labour leader Jeremy Corbyn instructs his MPs to support it.
 16 March: The bill receives Royal Assent.
 29 March: A letter from Theresa May is handed to President of the European Council Donald Tusk to invoke Article 50, starting a two-year process with the UK due to leave the EU on 29 March 2019.
 18 April: Theresa May announces that a general election is to take place on 8 June.
 8 June: A general election is held in the UK. The election results in a hung parliament, the Conservatives remains the largest single party in the House of Commons but loses its parliamentary majority, resulting in the formation of a new minority government with a confidence-and-supply arrangement with the Democratic Unionist Party (DUP) of Northern Ireland.
 19 June: Brexit negotiations commence.

2018
 6 July: A UK white paper on the future relationship between the UK and the EU, known as the Chequers agreement, is finalised.
 8 July: Davis resigns as Secretary of State for Exiting the European Union. Dominic Raab is appointed as his successor the following day.
 9 July: Boris Johnson resigns as foreign secretary.
 21 September: The EU rejects the UK white paper.
 14 November: The Brexit withdrawal agreement is published.
 15 November: Raab resigns as Secretary of State for Exiting the European Union. Steve  Barclay is appointed as his successor the following day.
 25 November: 27 other EU member states endorse the Withdrawal Agreement.

2019
 15 January: The First meaningful vote is held on the Withdrawal Agreement in the UK House of Commons. The UK government is defeated by 432 votes to 202.
 12 March: The Second meaningful vote on the Withdrawal Agreement with the UK government is defeated again by 391 votes to 242.
 14 March: The UK Government motion passes 412 to 202 to extend the Article 50 period.
 20 March: Theresa May requests the EU extend the Article 50 period until 30 June 2019.
 21 March: The European Council offers to extend the Article 50 period until 22 May 2019 if the Withdrawal Agreement is passed by 29 March 2019 but, if it does not, then the UK has until 12 April 2019 to indicate a way forward. The extension is formally agreed the following day.
 29 March: The original end of the Article 50 period and the original planned date for Brexit. Third vote on the Withdrawal Agreement after being separated from the Political Declaration. UK Government defeated again by 344 votes to 286.
 5 April: Theresa May requests for a second time that the EU extend the Article 50 period until 30 June 2019.
 10 April: The European Council grants another extension to the Article 50 period to 31 October 2019, or the first day of the month after that in which the Withdrawal Agreement is passed, whichever comes first. If the UK does not hold European Parliament elections in May 2019 (it did) it will leave on 1 June 2019.
 23 May: The UK holds elections to the European Parliament which sees, on the one hand, the Brexit Party led by Nigel Farage being the largest party winning 29 seats and, on the other hand, parties advocating a new referendum securing 37 seats and obtaining 55.5 percent of the vote. The largest of these was the strongly anti-Brexit Liberal Democrats led by Vince Cable coming second with 16 seats, ahead of the more ambiguous Labour Party on 10. The Conservatives fell to 4 seats on 8.8 percent, the biggest ever defeat of a governing party in a UK-wide election.
 24 May: Theresa May announces that she will resign as Conservative Party leader, effective 7 June, due to being unable to get her Brexit plans through parliament and several votes of no confidence, continuing as caretaker prime minister while a Conservative leadership contest takes place.
 18 July: MPs approve, with a majority of 41, an amendment to the Northern Ireland (Executive Formation etc) Act 2019 that blocks suspension of Parliament between 9 October and 18 December, unless a new Northern Ireland Executive is formed.
 24 July: Theresa May officially resigns and Boris Johnson accepts the Queen's invitation to form a new government and becomes Prime Minister of the United Kingdom, the third since the referendum.
 25 July: Both Houses of Parliament go into summer recess on 25 July until 3 September.
 28 August: Boris Johnson announces his intention to prorogue Parliament in September. The Queen would deliver a speech from the throne on 14 October to begin a new session. This was controversial because it would limit the time for Parliament to pass legislation ahead of the Article 50 deadline of 31 October. The Queen approved the timetable at a meeting of the Privy Council at Balmoral.
 3 September: A motion for an emergency debate to pass a bill that would rule out a unilateral no-deal Brexit by forcing the Government to get parliamentary approval for either a withdrawal agreement or a no-deal Brexit. This motion, to allow the debate for the following day, passed by 328 to 301. 21 Conservative MPs voted for the motion.
 4 September: The Benn Act passes second reading by 329 to 300; a 22nd Conservative, Caroline Spelman, voted against the Government position. Later the same day, MPs rejected Johnson's motion to call an October general election by a vote of 298 to 56, which failed to achieve the two-thirds Commons majority needed under the Fixed-term Parliaments Act. Labour MPs abstained from the vote.
 9 September: The Government again loses an attempt to call an election under the Fixed-term Parliaments Act. Dominic Grieve's humble address, requiring key Cabinet Office figures to publicise private messages about the prorogation of parliament, is passed by the House of Commons. Speaker John Bercow announces his intention to resign as Speaker of the House of Commons on or before 31 October. The Benn Act receives Royal Assent and becomes the European Union (Withdrawal) (No. 2) Act 2019. Parliament is prorogued until 14 October 2019. Party conference season begins, with anticipation building around a general election.
 24 September: The Supreme Court of the United Kingdom rules unanimously that Boris Johnson's decision to advise the Queen to prorogue parliament was unlawful, and that the prorogation itself is therefore null and of no effect.
 25 September: Parliament is recalled.
 2 October: The government publishes a white paper outlining a new plan to replace the Irish backstop, involving regulatory alignment across the island of Ireland but retaining a customs border between the Republic of Ireland and Northern Ireland. A further, shorter, prorogation is announced from 8to 14 October.
 7 October: The Outer House of the Court of Session in Edinburgh dismisses a case brought by petitioners, including Joanna Cherry, seeking a court order compelling Boris Johnson to write the letter requesting an extension that could be required by the Benn Act, in view of statements by Johnson and his representatives which it was said indicate that they might attempt to circumvent the Act. The Court accepted an assurance to it by the government's lawyers that Johnson would write the required letter. The Court also dismissed a request for an order preventing the government from frustrating the Benn Act, for example by asking another EU member state to veto a requested Brexit extension, after the government's lawyers undertook to the Court that no such action would be taken. There is to be an appeal to the Inner House of the Court of Session. Separately in the Inner House, the petitioners request a ruling that, if such a letter comes to be required and Johnson fails to write it, the Court will write the letter itselfan unusual procedure that is available only in Scotland.
 9 October: The Inner House delays its decision until 21 October, stating: "Until the time for sending the letter has arrived, the PM has not acted unlawfully, whatever he and his officials are reported to have said privately or in public. The situation remains fluid. Over the next two weeks, circumstances will inevitably change."
 14 October: Parliament returns for the Queen's Speech.
 17 October: The UK and European Commission agree on a revised withdrawal agreement containing a new protocol on Northern Ireland. The European Council endorses the deal.
 19 October: A special Saturday sitting of Parliament is held to debate the revised withdrawal agreement. The prime minister moves approval of that agreement. MPs first pass, by 322 to 306, Sir Oliver Letwin's amendment to the motion, delaying consideration of the agreement until the legislation to implement it has been passed; the motion is then carried as amended, implementing Letwin's delay. This delay activates the Benn Act, requiring the prime minister immediately to write to the European Council with a request for an extension of withdrawal until 31 January 2020.
 19 October: Prime minister Boris Johnson sends two letters to the president of the European Council, Donald Tusk: one, which is stated to be from the UK prime minister but is not signed, refers to the requirements of the Benn Act and requests an extension until 31 January 2020; the other, signed personally by Johnson and copied to all Council members, states that it is his own belief that a delay would be a mistake and requests support from the president and Council members for his continuing efforts to ensure withdrawal without an extension. The letters are delivered by the British permanent representative in Brussels, together with a cover note signed by himself which affirms that the first letter complies with the Benn Act.
 21 October: The Speaker refuses the government's request for a new vote on the withdrawal proposal, applying the convention that a motion that is the same "in substance" as an earlier one cannot be brought back during the course of a single parliamentary session.
 21 October: In the Inner House of the Court of Session, the petitioners concede that Johnson has fulfilled the requirement of the Benn Act that he write seeking an extension, but contend that his second letter negates the first. The Court refuses the government's request to dismiss the case, deciding that the case should remain before the court "until it is clear that the obligations under [the Benn Act] have been complied with in full". On 7 October, government lawyers had undertaken to the Outer House that Johnson would abide by all requirements of the Act, one of which is to respond to the EU's reaction to his letter. Any breach of that undertaking could place Johnson in contempt of the Court.
 21 October: The government introduces in the Commons the EU (Withdrawal Agreement) Bill with the title: "A Bill to Implement, and make other provision in connection with, the agreement between the United Kingdom and the EU under Article 50(2) of the Treaty on European Union which sets out the arrangements for the United Kingdom's withdrawal from the EU".
 22 October: The EU (Withdrawal Agreement) Bill is approved (second reading) by 329 votes to 299, but the accompanying "programme motion", to get all stages of the bill completed in three days and thus before 31 October, is defeated by 322 votes to 308 after MPs object that this would not allow time for adequate consideration. In Brussels, EU Council president Donald Tusk says he will recommend to the Council that it approve the UK's request for an extension.
 24 October: Prime Minister Boris Johnson asks Opposition leader Jeremy Corbyn to support on 28 October a government motion for a general election on 12 December (in order to achieve the two-thirds majority required by the Fixed-term Parliaments Act). Corbyn continues to insist that a no-deal Brexit must first be "off the table".
 25 October: Following a meeting of the European Commission, a spokesperson says that "the EU 27 have agreed to the principle of an extension and work will now continue in the coming days", and that they plan to decide on the date without an emergency summit.
 28 October: The European Council agrees to extend the Brexit deadline until 31 January 2020the third extension.
 28 October: Government motion for an election on 12 December is defeated by 299 to 70, short of the two-thirds majority required by the Fixed-term Parliaments Act, after most Labour MPs abstain. Government withdraws the EU (Withdrawal Agreement) Bill and states an intention to introduce on 29 October "a short bill for an election on 12 December".
 28 October The Liberal Democrats and the SNP announce support for an early election and propose their own one-page bill for an election on 9 December. 
 29 October: Government introduces the Early Parliamentary General Election Act 2019:
(1) An early parliamentary general election is to take place on 12 December 2019 in consequence of the passing of this Act.
(2) That day is to be treated as a polling day appointed under section 2(7) of the Fixed-term Parliaments Act 2011.
This measure would circumvent the Fixed-term Parliaments Act without amending it.
The Labour leadership supports the bill in principle, satisfied that the extension to 31 January (now confirmed) has taken the prospect of a no-deal Brexit "off the table". A government attempt to prevent non-government amendments fails, and an amendment from opposition parties to alter the date to 9 December is defeated. Amendments from opposition parties to reduce the voting age from 18 to 16 and to allow resident EU nationals to vote are ruled out by the Deputy Speaker (chairing) as not within the "scope" of the bill; the government had threatened to withdraw the bill if they were allowed. MPs pass the bill unamended by 438 votes to 20, with more than 100 Labour members abstaining and 11 voting against.
 30–31 October: The Early Parliamentary General Election Bill is passed unamended by the House of Lords and, upon receiving royal assent the following day, becomes law as the Early Parliamentary General Election Act 2019.
 6 November: Parliament dissolved.
 12 December: General election held.
 13 December: The Conservative Party gains a landslide 80-seat majority in parliament. Boris Johnson is invited to form his second government by The Queen, beginning his second term and allowing Brexit to be completed.
 20 December: The Withdrawal Agreement passes its second reading in the House of Commons in a 358–234 vote.

2020 

 22 January: the Withdrawal Agreement Bill proposed by Prime Minister Boris Johnson passes the UK parliament after several amendments proposed by the House of Lords were rejected by the House of Commons in a vote of 342–254. The Lords later decided not to propose further amendments, thereby allowing passage of the bill to the Queen to receive royal assent.
 23 January: the European Union (Withdrawal Agreement) Act 2020 receives royal assent.
 23 January: The constitutional committee in the European Parliament backs the withdrawal agreement, setting the expectation that it would be approved by the entire parliament.
 24 January: Ursula von der Leyen, Charles Michel, and Boris Johnson sign the withdrawal agreement. Von der Leyen and Michel signed the agreement in the Europa Building in Brussels and then sent the agreement in a diplomatic bag to 10 Downing Street in London for Johnson to sign the agreement.
 28 January: Chris Pincher becomes the last UK Minister to attend an EU meeting in Brussels when he was present at the General Affairs Council.
 29 January: The European Parliament gives its consent to the Council of the European Union to conclude the withdrawal agreement by 621 votes to 49. This also was the final time that MEPs from the United Kingdom sat in the European Parliament.
 30 January: The Council of the European Union concludes ratification of the withdrawal agreement.
 
 31 January: At 11 p.m. GMT the United Kingdom withdraws from the European Union, at the deadline set for its departure by the Article 50 extension agreed between the UK and the EU in October 2019, and transitional arrangements begin for the period ending on 31 December 2020.
 3 February: UK government objectives, as published, include:
 Respect the sovereignty of both parties and the autonomy of their legal orders. 
 No regulatory alignment, nor any jurisdiction for the CJEU over the UK's laws, nor any supranational control in any area, including the UK's borders and immigration policy.
 A suite of agreements of which the main elements would be a comprehensive free trade agreement covering substantially all trade, an agreement on fisheries, and an agreement to cooperate in the area of internal security, together with a number of more technical agreements covering areas such as aviation or civil nuclear cooperation.
 Future cooperation in other areas does not need to be managed through an international Treaty.
 The UK Government will be acting also on behalf of the UK Crown Dependencies and Overseas Territories: the whole UK family.
 The UK proposes to agree similar arrangements with the EFTA states.
 A free trade agreement between the UK and EU should reflect, and develop where necessary, existing international best practice as set out, inter alia, in FTAs already agreed by the EU.
 18 March: The EU publishes its draft proposal for a New Partnership with the UK, translating the Political Declaration agreed with the Withdrawal Agreement into a legal text.
 30 December: The European Union (Future Relationship) Act 2020 passes the House of Commons of the United Kingdom by 521 votes to 73.
 31 December: At 11 p.m. GMT the United Kingdom completes its separation from the European Union with the ending of the Brexit transition period. The UK ended the dynamic incorporation of future EU law, including most future judgments of the European Court of Justice, into UK law.
 1 January 2021: The withdrawal agreement, provided for a transition or implementation period until 00:00 Central European Time on (11pm Greenwich Mean Time on 31 December 2020 in the UK), during which time the UK remained in the single market, in order to ensure frictionless trade until a long-term relationship was agreed. If no agreement was reached by this date, then the UK would have left the single market without a trade deal on 1 January 2021. Closely connected to the withdrawal agreement is a non-binding political declaration on the future EU–UK relationship.

References

External links
 Brexit timeline: events leading to the UK’s exit from the European Union (House of Commons research paper January 6 2021) 

Brexit
Political timelines of the United Kingdom
Brexit
Brexit